Green Wing is a British sitcom set in the fictional East Hampton Hospital. It was created by the same team behind the sketch show Smack the Pony – Channel 4 commissioner Caroline Leddy and producer Victoria Pile – and stars Mark Heap, Tamsin Greig, Stephen Mangan and Julian Rhind-Tutt. It focuses on the soap opera-style twists and turns in the personal lives of the characters, portrayed in sketch-like scenes, and sequences in which the film is slowed down or sped up, often emphasising the body language of the characters. The show had eight writers. Two series were made by the Talkback Thames production company for Channel 4.

The series ran between 3 September 2004 and 19 May 2006. One episode, filmed with the second series, was shown as a 90-minute-long special on 4 January 2007 in the UK, but was shown earlier in Australia and Belgium on 29 December 2006. Separate from the series, a sketch was made for Comic Relief and screened on 11 March 2005. Another was performed live at The Secret Policeman's Ball on 14 October 2006.

Synopsis 
Green Wing's plot revolves around the lives of the staff of the East Hampton Hospital Trust, a fictional National Health Service (NHS) hospital with staff ranging from the slightly unusual to the completely surreal.

The series begins with a new arrival, surgical registrar Caroline Todd (Tamsin Greig). Caroline works alongside two other doctors: Guy Secretan (Stephen Mangan), an arrogant, half-Swiss, womanising anaesthetist, and "Mac" Macartney (Julian Rhind-Tutt), a suave, fashionable surgeon. Caroline soon develops feelings for both of them, though she is unsure as to which of the two she truly loves. Throughout the series, it becomes clear that Mac is her true love, but a range of misadventures prevent their relationship from flourishing. Other people Caroline meets include Martin Dear (Karl Theobald), a friendly house officer who is constantly failing his exams. He is unloved by his mother and is often bullied by Guy. Martin soon develops feelings for Caroline. There is also Angela Hunter (Sarah Alexander), a seemingly perfect, but irritating, senior registrar in pediatrics. Caroline dislikes Angela, but ends up taking her in as a lodger.

Caroline's main rival for Mac's affections is Sue White (Michelle Gomez), the Scottish staff liaison officer employed to listen and respond to the problems of East Hampton's staff. Sue is hostile and contemptuous towards everyone except Mac, whom she loves to the point of madness.

Alan Statham (Mark Heap) is an overbearing, stuttering and pedantic consultant radiologist. He is in a relationship with Joanna Clore (Pippa Haywood), the 48-year-old head of human resources, although she despises him. Their relationship is an open secret, with student doctor Boyce (Oliver Chris) often hinting at it when goading Alan. Joanna's staff include Kim Alabaster (Sally Bretton); Naughty Rachel (Katie Lyons); Harriet Schulenburg (Olivia Colman), an overworked mother of four trapped in an unhappy marriage; and Karen Ball (Lucinda Raikes), who is often bullied by Kim and Rachel.

Creation

Writers and crew 

Green Wing was devised, created and produced by Victoria Pile. She was also the casting director, one of the writers and was involved in the editing, filming and post-production. She described Green Wing as "a sketch-meets-comedy-drama-meets-soap", and a continuation of her previous show, Smack the Pony, where Green Wing's crew also worked. Unusually for a British sitcom, which normally has only one or two writers, the show had eight: Pile, her husband Robert Harley, Gary Howe, Stuart Kenworthy, Oriane Messina, Richard Preddy, Fay Rusling and James Henry.

Pile and her co-writers initially used battery packs to represent characters, moving them around on her desk to develop scenarios for the show. The decision to make the characters doctors came later. Pile recalls that she mentioned to Peter Fincham that a hospital setting would work well and that he subsequently reported that Channel 4 were enthusiastic about a hospital location, which settled the matter. Even later still, a plot was developed and wall charts were used to mark up story arcs.

The show was directed and edited (along with Pile) by Tristram Shapeero and Dominic Brigstocke. Sketches were sped up or slowed down to create comic effect, often using body language to create humour. Editing was also used due to the amount of corpsing that occurred during the filming of the show. Tamsin Greig was said to corpse frequently, and episodes were written to minimise the contact between the characters of Caroline Todd and Alan Statham because Greig found it difficult not to laugh when acting alongside Mark Heap. The music, which plays prominently in the show, was written by Jonathan Whitehead (under the name "Trellis") and won him an RTS Craft & Design Award.

Production 

Following her success with Smack the Pony, Channel 4 gave Pile a fairly free hand with her next project. Their only requirement was that it should have enough of a narrative thread to make it more of a sitcom than a sketch show.
  
The show had a half-hour pilot made in 2002 that was never aired. Scenes from the pilot were used in the first episode, "Caroline's First Day", and can be spotted due to the characters' appearance, most notably Rhind-Tutt's haircut. The pilot allowed the writers to experiment, such as using different filming techniques. In the pilot, Doon Mackichan played Joanna Clore and was meant to play her in the original series, but left when she became pregnant.

Although each script is fully written, the actors are allowed to improvise their own jokes, frequently adding to what has already been written. Normally workshops are used to allow actors to improvise their own material. One example of improvised material was Stephen Mangan's idea of Guy falling in love with Caroline. Rusling, Howe, Messina and Harley all have had speaking parts in the show, most notably Harley playing Charles Robertson, the hospital's CEO. The show's crew also make appearances in the show as extras. For example, Pile's former assistant Phil Secretan (after whom Guy is named) appears at the end of a scene in the first episode. Henry appears in the background during Martin's exam in the episode, "Tests".

The filming was done at two hospitals, the Northwick Park Hospital in Middlesex and the North Hampshire Hospital in Basingstoke. This presented a problem because the show had to work around the real-life hospitals, with their actual doctors, patients and emergency situations. In one scene in the final episode in series one, Guy (Mangan) was hitting squash balls behind him, and nearly hit a patient. However, some scenes, such as those in Sue's and Alan's offices, were filmed in a studio. The pub in series two is filmed at the Foundation Beefeater in Fulwell, a small area located between Twickenham and Teddington, South West London. 

Green Wing's title is said to have come from a small plastic green man with wings that was in executive producer Peter Fincham's top pocket, and fell on Pile's desk. Fincham claimed it was not his, so Pile kept it. This plastic man appears at the end of the credits on every show.

Unused storylines 

Green Wing had some plot lines that were never used. Unused storylines included Alan having an 80-year-old wife and step-grandchildren as old as him, and Guy suffering from impotence. Pile originally wanted the show to cover the entire hospital, not just doctors, but porters, car park attendants and kitchen staff. However, she decided that they had enough material with the eight main doctors and human resources workers.

Two endings were created for the special. The alternative ending is included on the DVD release of Green Wing, along with deleted scenes from the episode. The alternative ending was planned to be used if a third series was going to be commissioned, as this ending was much more ambiguous. It is known that the actors wanted the alternative ending, but after some debate, it was not shown.

Series summaries

Series 1 

Caroline arrives at East Hampton for her first day of work and meets her colleagues Guy and Mac. She is forced to spend her second day on the job quashing rumours that she slept with Guy after he put her up for the night. Failing junior doctor Martin soon falls in love with Caroline. Meanwhile, Alan and Joanna maintain their relationship as the worst kept secret in the hospital. Alan wants to shout their relationship from the rooftops, whereas Joanna wants more spontaneity and danger, so quickly turns her affections to Lyndon Jones (Paterson Joseph), the hospital's head of I.T.

Martin is revealed to be the son of Joanna Clore; she does not want anyone at the hospital to find out. Joanna briefly believes that she is pregnant once again, only to find out that the test results had been mixed up and it was in fact Harriet who was pregnant. Alan, elated by the thought that he may become a father, become obsessed with babies and suggests that they try for one when he finds out that Joanna is not pregnant. Joanna, bored of Alan's predictable behaviour, finally decides to end her relationship with him.

Caroline starts to get broody, but is unsure as to whether it is Mac or Guy that she loves. Sue White, staff liaison officer, is deeply in love with Mac, threatening to kill her love rivals. Both women are devastated to find that Mac is intending to move to Sheffield with his new girlfriend to take up a consultancy position. Before he leaves, Mac bets Guy that he would not be able to sleep with Joanna, so Guy picks her up at the leaving party. Caroline accuses Emily of being a fraudster, which turn out to be a misunderstanding, but Emily breaks up with Mac after he is amused rather than angered by Caroline's accusations. Mac and Caroline later kiss.
  
As they are about to leave, Caroline and Mac find out that there is an emergency at Guy's flat. Martin discovered that Joanna was also Guy's birth mother. When Caroline and Mac arrive in an ambulance, Guy steals it in a drunken rage, with Mac and Martin in the back. Guy drives the ambulance to Wales, where, in an attempt to avoid a sheep, they drive onto a cliff edge. The series ends with the three of them balanced precariously on the cliff edge.

Comic Relief sketch (2005) 

Mac fends off Sue's advances by saying he will only allow her to touch his arse if she can raise £10,000 for Comic Relief. Sue then proceeds to try to ask Martin, Joanna, Guy and Alan for the money, which she eventually manages to raise, though Mac runs off before she can get hold of him.

Series 2 

Eight weeks after the incident with the ambulance, Mac is in a coma and Guy has been suspended from his job. During his coma, Sue steals some of Mac's semen and tries to make herself pregnant. At the end of the first episode, Mac wakes up, but with amnesia which means he does not recall his nascent relationship with Caroline.

As Mac's memory returns, he and Caroline are on the verge of resuming their relationship when his former girlfriend Holly (Sally Phillips) returns to the hospital, to replace Angela, who has left to pursue a career in television. Holly has a son, called Mackenzie, who she says is Mac's. Caroline distances herself from Mac and starts dating Jake Leaf (Darren Boyd), a complementary therapist. Sue then discovers that Holly is lying, that Mac is not her son's father after all. Holly leaves the hospital. Caroline, excited by the news, leaves Jake.

When Alan becomes unusually happy after winning an internet caption competition, Joanna seeks to destroy his good humour. Using her dwarf cousin (Big Mick), dressed up in green body paint, she plans to scare him. The plan backfires when Alan is so scared that he beats Joanna's cousin to death with a stuffed heron. Alan and Joanna throw the body into the incinerator, but become paranoid that they will be discovered. Alan, however, learns from Boyce that the death is being viewed as a suicide, so Alan and Joanna go on a rampage, thinking themselves above the law.

After the death of a patient known as "Yo-yo Man" who offers them wise advice, Guy, Mac and Martin all decide to propose to Caroline. She rejects Martin, considers the offer from Guy, and Mac appears to be unable to form a proposal. Mac then tells Caroline to meet him at the railway station for a weekend away, but then suddenly discovers that he is terminally ill, and rides off into the distance on his motorbike. Guy goes to the railway station where he finds that Caroline is now willing to accept his proposal. Meanwhile, in the HR department, Karen is sitting on a windowsill, believing that there are Clangers in the office. Whilst on the phone to a friend, Rachel opens the window, tipping Karen out in the process. As the day continues, no one seems to notice her absence.

The police arrive at the hospital. Alan and Joanna believe that they will be arrested, and with Boyce's help escape from the hospital in a stolen camper van. When they discover that Martin is hidden in the back of the van, Alan, panicking, drives into a field, and series two ends in the same way as series one, with the van hanging over the edge of a cliff.

Secret Policeman's Ball sketch (2006) 

A sketch was performed for Amnesty International's Secret Policeman's Ball, with performances from Tamsin Greig, Stephen Mangan, Julian Rhind-Tutt and Michelle Gomez. Mangan and Rhind-Tutt appeared in two sketches.

When the announcer at the ball asks if there is a doctor in the house, Mac puts his hand up, to Caroline's embarrassment. Things get more embarrassing when Guy also volunteers, and asks why Caroline is sitting next to Mac when she is Guy's fiancée. An unconscious patient lies on an operating table. Guy touches her breasts, takes pictures of her naked body under the blanket, and kisses her. Caroline alleges that the patient is transgender, which repels Guy. Sue White then appears in a tutu, claiming that the patient is stalking Mac, and repeating the assertion that the patient is transgender.

Special 

The episode begins with the funeral of Angela, who departed the show during the second series, and was later killed by a moose. Mac, after a month's leave, discovers what has happened between Caroline and Guy, and although hurt, makes no attempt to interfere. Guy, on learning of Mac's terminal illness, tells Caroline to marry Mac instead of him.

Meanwhile, Alan and Joanna are still on the run, having abandoned Martin. Whilst on their journey, they accidentally kill three more people, a mechanic, a shop assistant and a policeman. Soon, they decide that, with no transport, money or employment, the only option is suicide. They are last seen, naked, walking hand-in-hand towards the sea. Meanwhile, Karen returns to work after her fall, but has changed drastically. She has become more confident and has developed better dress sense. Boyce ends up missing Alan, after finding that his replacement will not tolerate any misbehaviour. With Joanna gone, the office girls start to run riot. They form their own tribe and become hostile to anyone who enters the department.

Mac and Caroline finally marry, despite Mac's terminal illness (the exact nature of which is never disclosed, although Mac does tell Guy that its name has an "a" and an "e" in it). Sue gets over her obsession with Mac and finds love with a new man, who reciprocates her feelings. The episode concludes with Caroline being carried into the air by a mass of helium filled balloons at the wedding reception. The DVD box set extras include an alternative ending where Guy and Mac grab onto Caroline's ankles and are taken to the sky with her; this alternative ending ends with Mac saying, "Caroline, there's something I've been meaning to tell you."

Cast

Main characters 
 Mark Heap – Alan Statham
 Tamsin Greig – Caroline Todd
 Sarah Alexander – Angela Hunter
 Sally Bretton – Kim Alabaster
 Oliver Chris – Boyce
 Olivia Colman – Harriet Schulenburg
 Michelle Gomez – Sue White
 Pippa Haywood – Joanna Clore
 Katie Lyons – Naughty Rachel
 Stephen Mangan – Guy Secretan
 Lucinda Raikes – Karen Ball
 Julian Rhind-Tutt – "Mac" Macartney
 Karl Theobald – Martin Dear

Recurring characters 
 Darren Boyd – Jake Leaf
 Keir Charles – Oliver
 Daisy Haggard – Emmy
 Paterson Joseph – Lyndon Jones
 Sally Phillips – Holly Hawkes

Critical reaction 

The show received generally very positive reviews. The Evening Standard said that it was "a comedy as physically adroit as it was verbally sharp", and The Guardian said that "Channel 4’s hospital sitcom is the most innovative comedy since, well, The Office." In a review of television in 2006, Kathryn Flett in The Observer voted it one of the top ten TV programmes of the year. In Broadcast magazine, the second series was voted joint-second best comedy series in 2006. In South Africa, where Green Wing is broadcast on BBC Prime, The Sunday Times of South Africa voted the show the best DStv programme of 2007. Composer Daniel Pemberton wrote that the soundtrack to Green Wing was, "One of the most innovative TV soundtracks in recent years."

Criticisms of Green Wing include the lazzi methods of filming and the overall length of the episodes, with some critics claiming that hour-long episodes are too long. The show won the 2005 and 2006 Comedy Tumbleweed Awards for "Worst Camerawork". Some were also critical of what was seen as a decline in quality when the second series began. Cathy Pryor in The Independent on Sunday said that, "Sadly, though, since I'm something of a fan, I have to report that the first episode of the second series is, disappointingly, rather flat. To be fair, there were a couple of laugh-out-loud moments - Dr Statham banging his head and falling down being one of them - but the whole [thing] didn't quite gel. Or should that be coagulate? I'll stop making bad jokes now since I'm still not as funny as anyone in the show. But I sincerely hope that the opener is a one- off and not a sign that Green Wing is going down the pan."

Similar comments were made by A. A. Gill. When the first series was broadcast, he praised the cast and characters, but commented negatively on the filming style and dramatic qualities. He also said:

"...it was one of the most freshly funny and crisply innovative comedies for years. The humour was all based in the character, not the situation. The story lines were negligible; there were no catch phrases; it was surreal in a way we hadn’t seen since Monty Python; and the cast were actors being funny from inside a characterisation, not stand-up comics bolting a cartoon persona onto the back of gags."

Subsequently, Gill critiqued the first episode of series two, in particular the use of a dream sequence at the beginning of the episode. He wrote,

"Now, every 11-year-old knows dream sequences are the lowest form of plotting solution, lower than unexplained superpowers such as the ability to stop time or become invisible; even lower than a magic get-better potion. Within two minutes, Green Wing had destroyed itself, lost its assured grip on the cliff of comedy and tumbled into the abyss of embarrassing overacting, formless gurning and pointless repetition. What had once looked Dada-ishly brilliant now looked like stoned improv from a show-off's drama school. The lack of plot and coherent narrative that previously had been a blessed freedom was revealed to be a formless free-for-all, brilliant performances as silly mannerisms. Nothing I've seen this year has disappointed me as sharply as the second series of Green Wing. As Tom Paine so poignantly pointed out, only a step separates the sublime from the ridiculous."

The rest of the series received some praise and, in a 2009 article, Gill - writing about the current comedy output at the time - said: "Show me a funny indigenous comedy series; show me one that has been made in the past five years, other than Green Wing."

Media

DVDs

Books 
The first series scripts were released as Green Wing: The Complete First Series Scripts in paperback on 22 October 2006, by Titan Books. The book contains bonus material made exclusively for the book and previously unseen photos.

Soundtrack 
The soundtrack, entitled Green Wing: Original Television Soundtrack by Trellis was released by Silva Screen on 8 October 2007. It contains 23 tracks of the best of Jonathan Whitehead's Original Music created for the show.

Online viewing 
It is available (both complete series) on Channel 4 on Demand and on the LoveFilm instant streaming service run by Amazon in the United Kingdom.

Awards and nominations 
Green Wing won the first BAFTA Pioneer Audience Award in 2005. This is the only BAFTA award that is voted on by the general public. Pippa Haywood won the 2005 Rose d'Or for "Best Female Comedy Performance". Tamsin Greig won an award at the RTS Awards in 2005 for "Best Comedy Performance". Jonathan Whitehead won "Best Original Score" at the RTS Craft & Design Awards 2005. Greig received a BAFTA nomination for Best Comedy Performance in 2005, losing to David Walliams and Matt Lucas.

Green Wing has also won a number of times in The Comedy.co.uk Awards, including the "Comedy of the Year" award in 2006.

Possible spin-off 
The cast, crew and writers of Green Wing have shown no interest in creating a third series because of scheduling difficulties due to new projects being undertaken by the creators and talkbackTHAMES not having a big enough budget. However, creator Victoria Pile mentioned in a 2007 interview in the Radio Times that she may do a spin-off, saying, "I'm hoping to do another Channel 4 comedy imminently, possibly starring some of the same cast. Hopefully, it will be some kind of spin-off from Green Wing."

In 2009, Pile and most of the writing team behind Green Wing created a sitcom pilot set in a university entitled Campus, which features similar concepts to Green Wing, including improvisation. The motto of the university is "with wings", a reference to the show. The pilot was broadcast as part of Channel 4's Comedy Showcase. A full series began in 2011, but was cancelled after one series.

Impact 
A cocktail called the Green Wing was served at the 2005 BAFTAs. It was made using vodka, cloudy apple juice, elderflower cordial and sparkling mineral water. A Green Wing convention called "Wingin' It" was organised to raise money for Great Ormond Street Hospital, and took place on 13 January 2007 at the Brook Green Hotel, Hammersmith. There was a special appearance by Green Wing cast at the British Film Institute, on 17 January 2007; Pile, Greig, Mangan and Rhind-Tutt appeared. Some of the other writers, as well as Theobald and Heap, were in the audience. The event was hosted by John Lloyd. Green Wing appeared in an episode of the BBC documentary series Imagine, entitled A Funny Thing Happened on the Way to the Studio. Some of the funeral scenes from the special were shown, and the presenter of the show, Alan Yentob, appeared as one of the mourners.

References

External links 

 
 Green Wing at the British Film Institute
 
 

 
2004 British television series debuts
2007 British television series endings
2000s British medical television series
2000s British sitcoms
2000s British workplace comedy television series
BAFTA winners (television series)
Channel 4 sitcoms
English-language television shows
British surreal comedy television series
Television series by Fremantle (company)
Television shows set in London